Crescent Creek is a river in the south-east region of the Canadian province of Saskatchewan. The river begins in the Beaver Hills and flows in an easterly direction into Crescent Lake. Crescent Creek is a tributary of Yorkton Creek, which flows north into the Whitesand River–a tributary of the Assiniboine River.

Beginning in the RM of Garry No. 245, Crescent Creek flows south-east into the RM of Stanley No. 215 and on towards the city of Melville. North-west of the city, the river empties into Melville Reservoir. From there, Crescent Creek carries on eastward skirting the northern edge of Melville, running through the middle of Melville Golf and Country Club, and crossing Highways 47 and 10. After Melville, the river continues east into the RM of Cana No. 214 and Crescent Lake. Crescent Lake is a shallow lake that connects to Leech Lake, the source of Yorkton Creek.

Melville Reservoir 
Melville Reservoir, also known as Crescent Creek Reservoir, is a man-made lake along the course of Crescent Creek north-west of Melville. The dam was built in 1921 by the Canadian National Railway (CNR) to create a reservoir to supply water for its operations. The city of Melville bought the reservoir in 1958 and, in 1959, a water treatment plant was built to supply drinking water to the city. The water plant has undergone several upgrades since then. In 1977, a  storage reservoir was added next to the treatment plant and in 1979 the reservoir was expanded to its current size.

At the southern end of the lake, on the north side of the dam, is a 2.1-kilometre loop hiking trail. Another hiking trail,  in length, goes from the lake to Melville along the north side of Crescent Creek.

See also 
List of rivers of Saskatchewan
List of lakes of Saskatchewan
Hudson Bay drainage basin

References 

Rivers of Saskatchewan
Lakes of Saskatchewan
Cana No. 214, Saskatchewan
Garry No. 245, Saskatchewan
Stanley No. 215, Saskatchewan
Tributaries of the Assiniboine River
Tributaries of Hudson Bay